Jairamnagar is a railway station and also named after a town in India. It is about 4.9 kilometers (3 miles) from Masturi and about 14 kilometers (8.7 miles) from Bilaspur, Chhattisgarh. The station code is JRMG.

History 
On 1 September 1939, the Bengal Nagpur Railway was named after Rai Bahadur Jairam Valji Chauhan, a notable Kutchi railway contractor.  Jairamnagar is the only railway station in India named after a businessman. The town was known as Paragaht before its 1939 renaming. Rai Bahadur Jairam Valji Chauhan was once the sole proprietor of the Jairamnagar village; he owned mining sites of dolomite, manganese, and limestone.

Demographics and economy 
Jairamnagar has a large pond, previously a limestone quarry, that belonged to Rai Bahadur Jairam Valji Chauhan. The pond's water is used by locals for daily needs such as cooking, washing, and bathing. A Shiva temple, built in 1922 by Jairam Valji Chauhan, sits nearby. 

Jairamnagar is mainly known for its coal exports; residents are primarily coal workers and shopkeepers. Coal depots were converted from new farms, and most of the coal storage spaces were owned by the fourth generation of the Bandhe family.

The settlement has some well-known schools. 

The population of the town was 5,293 in 2011.

References

 Villages in Bilaspur district, Chhattisgarh